Concept of smart villages is a global modern approach for off-grid communities.  Vision behind this concept is to assist the policy makers, donors and socio-economic planner for rural electrification worldwide.

The concept has received much attention in the context of Asian and African countries, although it is also found in other parts of the world such as Europe.  Smart villages concept is engaged in efforts to combat the real barriers to energy access in villages, particularly in developing countries with technological, financial and educational methodology.  A major focus of smart villages is the adoption of renewable resource in place of fossil fuel, which is seen as the best approach that can be developed through off-grid systems or communities.

Off-grid systems and off-grid communities

The term “Off-grid” itself is very broad and simply refers to "not using or depending on electricity provided through main or national grids and generated by main power infrastructures.  The term is also used to describe a particular lifestyle which is embodied by autonomous structures. Off-grid systems have a semi or autonomous capability to satisfy electricity demand through local power generation.  The term off-grid systems cover both mini-grids for serving multiple users and stand-alone systems for individual appliance or users.  In spite witnessing use of fossil fuel for power generation by mini or individual off-grid system, it is broadly defined that off-grid systems are actually based on renewable energy resources. The terms "micro-grid, nano-grid and pico-grid are used to differentiate different kinds of mini-grids with size thresholds under off-grid approach.

Access to un-interrupted and low cost electricity for socio-economic development is an important requirement.  There is a universal demand of grid-based and off-grid solutions to ensure access to electricity all over the world, without off-grid approach increasing demand and decreasing supply cannot be stabilized for the mankind on this planet.

About 80% of world's population live in rural areas and majority of these people do not have access to electricity.  Due to lack of employment people from rural areas migrate to urban areas where they find employment opportunities much easily because of industrial infrastructure established primarily on availability of electricity. International Renewable Energy Agency (IRENA) power generation projects based on renewable energy technology at low cost are the attractive option for off-grid electrification in most of the rural areas of Asian countries.  Its work will satisfy the rural electricity demand and provide employment opportunities to minimize the rapid urbanization.

ICT Village Model

The ICT Village model stems from the need to provide technologies and services to the most disadvantaged communities to enable them to promote their own development. The replicable model of ICT Village focuses on three types of intervention: i) ensuring an education to young people aimed at enhancing local resources and creating jobs; ii) ensuring a basic level of health; iii) providing internet access to the whole community to strengthen its capacity for socio-economic development.

The ICT Village model, developed and launched by OCCAM, The Observatory on Digital Communication has had a large echo, influencing deeply different levels of the society: the model has even been cited by the USSTRATCOM Global Innovation and Strategy Center in one of its document concerning the Village Infrastructure Kit-Alpha (VIKA).

ICT Village in Honduras: The Solar Village

The first ICT village project was carried out in 1999 in Honduras, hit by the devastating hurricane Mitch. With the support of UNESCO, the INFOPOVERTY PROGRAMME, the Organization of American States (OEA), the Ministry of Science and Technology (COHCIT) and the local University (UCyT) and the main international organization, it was possible to implement two projects initially called Solar Village in the communities of San Ramon and San Francisco de Lempira. Thanks to the use of solar panels and the first satellite equipped for the Internet of OnSatNet, the supply of electricity was guaranteed, and a connection to 108 mb / sec, a real record for the time, able to provide more than 30,000 people the first e-learning and telemedicine services provided, allowing the population to use these new technologies advantageously and to connect to the rest of the world through e-commerce and e-government initiatives.

ICT Village in Tunisia: Borji Ettouil

Presented and discussed in several Infopoverty World Conferences, held annually at the United Nations Headquarters in New York, the model is proposed to the Government of Tunisia for an experimentation in the village of Borji Ettouil at the WSIS Summit in November 2003. The success of this WSIS - ICT Village - supported by the National Solidarity Fund  and visited by numerous government delegations and personalities, who appreciated the operational applications of telemedicine, e-learning and internet community access - allows validating their effectiveness and opens the doors to numerous invitations to replicate it over the years in various countries, including Peru, Ethiopia, Dominican Republic, Lesotho, Tunisia, Ghana, South Lebanon, Navajo Nation, Madagascar.

ICT Village in Lebanon: Meiss al-Jabal

In particular, in the village of Meiss al-Jabal, in South Lebanon, born from a collaboration with Staffan de Mistura, High Representative of the UN Secretary General in the region, as a support action for the refugee communities, it was provided with two digitized classrooms, satellite connection and various specialized devices for remote consultation and assistance services, obtaining a rapid professionalization of the students, to offer them hope for the future. Unfortunately, with the War in Lebanon in 2006, many villages have been destroyed, including Meiss al-Jabal. Moreover, OCCAM promoted the birth of the Beirut Film Festival with the Ministry of Culture and the International Council for Film Television and Audiovisual Communication, and the reconstruction of the National Film Archive to make a contribution to the UN Peacekeeping action. 

ICT Village and Navajo Nation

John Shirley, at that time, President of the Navajo Nation, at the World Summit on the Information Society, organized by the ITU in Tunis, 2005, where he announced the birth of the Navajo Nation Portal.
Another important project is the Navajo Nation Portal, announced in 2005 during the intervention at the WSIS in Tunis by John Shirley, president of the Navajo Nation  co-signatory of the Memorandum of understanding with ITU and OCCAM, for the development of digitalization in indigenous populations, which sees the creation in many pueblos of access and training centers.

ICT Village in Madagascar: The UN Millennium Village of Sambaina

A longlasting project is the ICT Village of Sambaina, born also thanks to the support of the then President of the Malgasy Republic S.E. Marc Ravalomanana.

Here the project has been developed focusing on:

• telemedicine, with the establishment of a new digitalized health unit, especially on maternal care, achieving a reduction in pre-postpartum and early childhood mortality,

• e-learning, with classes equipped with computers and other digital devices and courses.

• center for internet access for the population of the district.

All the vast territory, after a first satellite coverage provided by Eutelsat / Skylogic, was connected in broadband using the state frequencies, so that hospitals, schools, municipalities, operated without charges, stating the principle, then decided in UNGAID, that public services must be able to take advantage of public broadband networks.

Sambaina soon arouses international attention, including the visit of Jeffrey Sachs, director of the UN Millennium Project and Special Advisor of the Secretary General Kofi Annan, who proclaimed him in 2006 the first and only one of its kind, Millennium Village towards which both UNDP and the Millennium Challenge Corporation USA will launch support programs.

The Ville Village Project

In support of Sambaina and the other ICT Village, OCCAM launched the Ville Village Project in 2005 to encourage direct collaboration  between communities in developing countries and cities in advanced countries, which have greatly encouraged the integration in the perspective of mutual cultural and social enrichment and in order to optimize the resources put in place by both local authorities and NGOs in development cooperation projects.

The first Ville-Village realization was ratified with the agreement signed by the Ambassador of Madagascar in Italy, H.E. Jean Pierre Razafi, on 4 December 2008, and the mayor of Lodi Lorenzo Guerini, Within this initiative the city of Lodi has been selected to better employ the features of its territory, such as the Padano Technology Park, the Hospital (already active in the telemedicine sector) and the NGOs operating in its territory. Innovative digital development service centers have also been created, focusing on e-phytopathology, and e-veterinary.

The ICT Village in Lesotho: Mahobong

The ICT Village of Mahobong, in Lesotho, experimented in 2007 the Digital Services Global Platform, both in the field of Food Security with applications of e-phytopathology and parasitology and of telemedicine, through a new ultrasound device, which allow remote ultrasounds suitable for prevent pre- and post-natal mortality and assist emergency interventions. The project realized by OCCAM in collaboration with the Department of Protection of Agrifood and Urban Systems and Biodiversity Valorization of the University of Milan and with the International Telemedicine Institute (IITM), supported by the Municipality of Milan, has allowed to export knowledge in the field of cultivation and protection of plants and food and limit production losses caused to production, giving considerable development to the communities involved.

Smart villages in Asia
According to a publication written for the International Finance Corporation (IFC) in 2012, Asia has the largest off-grid population in the world, with 55% of the global off-grid population, and 798 million people having no access to electricity. As per estimates about 700 million or 90% were located in rural Asia. However, research studies reveal that South Asian and Sub-Saharan African countries have been unable to expand their electrification rate.  Whereas electrification progress in regions such as Latin America and East Asia (China) indicates a rapid growth.  Central Asian countries are blessed with sufficient resources and export their extra electricity to neighboring countries.

Electrification is highly desired by all rural communities. Different international, national and local organizations use different indicators for measuring and reporting mini-grids or stand-alone systems.  South Asian countries have been focusing on off-grid electrification of current trend for Rural Electrification (RE) at regional level.   India, Bangladesh, Sri Lanka and Nepal have shown good results for RE through off-grid communities.

Eastern Asia/East Asia
About 38% of the population of Asia and 22% in the world, live in East Asia.

 Public confidence in safety of nuclear power was greatly damaged  by the Fukushima Daiichi nuclear disaster, consequently Off-grid concept was applied more conveniently in Japan. Alternative energy technologies have become standard in newly constructed homes. Sekisui House Ltd, a famous Japanese house building firm pointed out that 80% of single-family homes were constructed with alternative energy technology such as solar panels and fuel cells. Reflecting the nation's mood, Executive Director of Sekisui Company states that "If you’re going to use electricity, you might as well make it yourself".

 In June, 2015 Smart Villages (New thinking  for off-grid communities worldwide) has conducted a workshop in Seoul to familiarize the people of South Korea about the fast evolving technology moving towards off-grid communities and its support for bright ideas and entrepreneurial efforts in the field of rural energy access.

 According to IRENA report China in 2013, besides wind farms, had roughly 60,000 diesel and hydro mini-grid systems, most of them connected to the centralized grid.  It has further installed 118 GW of solar Photovoltaics systems, of which 500 MW was installed in off-grid systems.

 Acknowledging Solar as green technology, Malaysia has been encouraging solar power for rural electrification and reaffirmed its support of research into off-grid electricity through alternate energy.  Malaysian Government also considering potential of smart villages and each village would differ according to the needs of its population.

 People of Indonesia living in rural areas have been facing low electrification and using fossil fuel for power supply.  Additionally many remote communities still lack access to any power at all with little expectation of being supplied on-grid power by the state-owned electricity company (PLN).  In the recent past Indonesian government has initiated a properly developed, constructed and sustainable community-owned renewable energy plan to raise the quality of life in rural communities, and under this project plants should be owned, managed and maintained by the rural communities.  In 2013 EnDev Indonesia was awarded first prize in the category “Community-based Off-grid”, with its project on micro-hydro power in Lembah Derita, Sumatra Barat.

 With more than 2,000 inhabited islands, it is difficult in Philippines to extend electrical grid to communities in remote areas.   In a documentary presentation, CEO of Hybrid Social Solutions Inc. indicated distribution of solar products that have been delivered to poor communities across the Philippines with a future plan of building an ecosystem to support standalone solar energy devices for use by the rural communities. They have also considered it essential to ensure the sustainability and future growth in remote areas with community based solar projects.

  has been focusing on modern technologies for overcoming its chronic energy shortage.  Utilization of alternative energy sources in place of fossil fuel consumption is being considered to satisfy the socio-economic requirements of its people

Western Asia/West Asia and Middle East
Geographical marking in the Western Asia consists of 19 countries/territorial states.  5 countries of Asia from this region hold strong financial stability and resources for social development.  In this region three countries, According to population demography Turkey, Iraq and Yemen stand at 10th, 13th and 20th position respectively.

 With a substantial potential for the renewable energy resources, Turkey holds seventh position in the world (and first in Europe) in terms of geothermal energy. It has also planned to further increase its hydro, wind and solar energy resources. Turkey envisages producing 30% of its electricity need from the renewable by 2023.

 Ten years after the war, the power supply was short of demand.  But in April, 2013 Oil Ministry of Iraq highlighted its plan stating that: "By the end of 2013, the crisis will be over for households with supply of electricity around the clock across the country. By the end of 2014, Iraq would have met industrial demand as well”. However, political instability and role of terrorism by the terrorists in Iraq reliable and neutral assessment is still a hard job.

 Prior to Saudi Arabian-led intervention in Yemen in Yemen, energy and power supply scenario reveals that  93%  Yemenis rural population was using gas canisters as their primary source of fuel.  They also spent 55% of their income on food, water and energy. Power supply, where available, comes from government-run plants, the majority of which run on diesel. New capacity additions were slow with poor transmission network

Northern Asia
 Covers largest part of Asia with a 17,098,242 km2 area in the Northern sub-region of Asia. Russia is the world's fourth largest electricity producer after the United States, China, and Japan. Russia exports electricity to countries e.g. Latvia, Lithuania, Poland etc.  However, import and export reversal has also been reported due to cost of production.

South Asia
 With its insufficient power supply infrastructure covers its electricity demand through import from electricity-exporting countries i.e. Uzbekistan, Tajikistan, Turkmenistan and Iran, these countries mostly sell their surplus electricity to Afghanistan. Above 4 billion US dollars have so far been disbursed to build power supply infrastructure in Afghanistan but deficiencies not only to its rural/remotes areas but country's capital needs more considerable  help from developed countries for supply of electrification to whole Afghanistan One of the largest solar power project funded at a cost  $18 by the government of New Zealand has started functioning for supply of energy to 2,500 households, businesses and government buildings in central Bamyan Province of Afghanistan.

 According to a World Bank document, about 62% of Bangladesh's population had access to electricity in 2013, indicating 90% and 43% wide disparity between urban and rural areas.  Bangladesh while standing at 134th out of 144 countries on the quality of electricity supply, Renewable Energy for Rural Economic Development (RERED) Project sought to raise levels of social development and economic growth by increasing access to electricity in rural areas.  Under REFED  notable contribution to social and economic outcomes in rural areas by extending access to electricity through off-grid Solar Home Systems (SHS),  has been witnessed and  noted with significant increase in  Household appliances.  The World Bank report envisaged that Off-grid systems can accelerate the benefits of “lighting” in a cost-effective manner, to populations that face uncertain waiting periods for grid-based electricity, or are unlikely to obtain grid-based electricity due to remote or inaccessible locations.  Report also focus the role of off-grid communities based on public-private partnership model for off-grid electricity services to the deprived population of Bangladesh.

 With mini-grids and off-grid applications, India is a leading country.  The Jawaharlal Nehru National Solar Mission (JNNSM) is its main policy initiative to promote solar energy, including off-grid power development. International Finance Corporation (IFC) and the World Bank collaborate with various stakeholders for global off-grid lighting market for reliable electricity to people who have no access to national grids. A neutral, independent, not for profit association called Global Off-Grid Lighting Association (GOGLA) was conceived out of a joint World Bank/IFC Lighting Africa and private sector effort in 2012. India is the first Asian lighting programs for IFC.  Lighting Asia/India program was planned to enable access of two million rural Indians to off-grid lighting solutions by 2015. The program is designed with a series of interventions to alter market behavior by removing specific barriers, for example, the market spoilage created by poor products, lack of information on quality products and on distribution channels, lack of financing for companies and consumers, lack of awareness that quality solar appliances are affordable and viable.

India's first smart village has been developed by Eco Needs Foundation at Dhanora village of Rajasthan. The concept is prepared by Prof. Priyanand Agale, Dr. Satyapal Singh Meena an officer of Indian Revenue Service (IRS) and Mr. Attdeep Agale. This concept consists of five elements Retrofitting, Redevelopment, Greenfield, e-Pan and Livelihood. Under the project of smart village the Foundation is adopting villages and putting efforts for sustainable development by providing basic amenities like sanitation, safe drinking water, internal road, tree plantation, water conservation. The Foundation is also working for inculcating moral values in the society and for improving the standard of living of the villagers.  The Foundation has developed Village Dhanora, Teh. Bari, District Dholpur, one of the remotely situated village of Rajasthan as India's First Smart Village. The village is situated 30 km away from Dholpur district headquarter and 248 km from Jaipur city, Capital of Rajasthan State of India. The population of the village was nearly about 2000 having no sanitation facility, potable water facility, which were adversely causing the health of the villagers. The internal roads are also not there and it causes great hardship to the people especially in rainy season. Owing to unawareness and non-availability of sanitation facility and toilets the people of the village use to go open for defecation. There are other problems also which villagers were facing such as Fluoride concentration in drinking water, No water conservation System, Encroachment on the roads, Electrical power fluctuation No outcome base education, Unemployment and poverty. ProF. Priyanand Agale Founder, president of Foundation and Dr. Satyapal Singh Meena officer of the Indian Revenue service has converted this village as India's first Smart Village and now Dhanora has become a role model of Rural Development.  Following are the major success achieved within a short span of two years of the project and project is still underway:
Construction of 822 toilets in the Panchayat area with the help of district administration and public participation accordingly, the Dhanora Gram Panchayat has been declared as the first “Open Defecation Free” (ODF) Panchayat by District Administration.
Village Dhanora become India's first village having sewerage line with treatment plant. The Foundation has laid down nearly 2 km long sewerage line of diameter 450 mm in the village. Each of the toilets of Dhanora village have been connected to sewerage line with inspection chambers.
Construction of nearly 2 km long cement concrete internal roads constructed with 3.5 m to 4.5 m width with high quality.
Construction of eight Percolation tank connecting with nearly 2.5 km artificial channel of 10 feet in width and 10 feet in depth for water conservation and ground water recharge with public participation and with the help of government having groundwater recharge capacity of 97.49 Million liters in one time recharge, which will provide irrigation facility to farms of the village and nearby villages resulting into economic growth of farmers.
The work of the removal of encroachments and road widening has been completed without using any police force. Now the whole village is having motorable road in the village.
Construction of nearly 2 km approach road at Dhodekapura village of the Dhanora Panchayat, which was not done in last 65 years.
The police Administration is going to declare the village as “APRADH MUKKTA GAON” (Crime Free Village), no case or FIR in Police Station.
village Dhanora has been converted into an Art gallery. The paintings in the village are spreading social awareness among villagers  
The foundation stone for community centre and information centre has been laid down, work under progress. Work of solar street light, skill development centre, library, meditation centre, sport complex, Wi-Fi facility, and community toilet will be taken up in due course of time and as per availability of funds.

 President of Maldives has already launched an initiative to make the Maldives a solar power stronghold to provide rooftop solar panels in the rural and remote areas of the country.  Under this project together with a plan to achieve carbon neutral Maldives by 2020, first solar energy panels was installed in one of the school in Villimale district of Male that accompanied the inauguration of the project.  However, Maldives needs more concentration  over electrification demand of its people especially in rural and remote areas.

 Hydro power and solar resources are sufficient enough to satisfy the electricity demand of the Nepal.  However, most of the country's current energy needs are met with inefficiently used biomass, including firewood (75%), agricultural residues (4%) and animal waste (6%). The rest is met by commercial sources, including petroleum, coal and electricity. Only about 12 percent of the country's population uses electricity derived from water, wind or sun.In Nepal above 50% households mostly in urban or semi-urban areas are connected to the national grid.  Its 80% population is rural. Government of Nepal has launched National Rural and Renewable Energy Program in 2012 with subsidize strategy in an attempt to electrify long-deprived areas.  Per Nepal Living Standard Survey 2011 estimates 96% urban 63% rural population  has access to electricity. With a total capacity of 107 kW, Nepal's first mini-grid of its kind was set up in 2012 connecting the micro-hydro plants in Rangkhani, Paiyuthanthap, Sarkuwa and Damek. Besides UNDP is encouraging to put the community at the center of the planning, installing, and operating processes of micro-hydro plants.

 Geographically is located to a place where exploitation of solar energy is most conducive, as it is 6th country in the world in terms of solar irradiance where sunshine availability is 8 to 10 hours per day in its most parts. Mini wind farming projects (1-50 kWatts) along with small solar farms scattered over remote inaccessible areas. Use of solar energy in rural villages of Pakistan with solar panels is growing on off-grid concept with increasing community systems.  The Aga Khan Rural Support Programme and the Sarhad Rural Support Programme (through Programme for Economic Advancement and Community Empowerment) have been encouraging village organizations to promote and establish community based micro hydro power projects across Khyber Pakhtunkhwa, Gilgit–Baltistan, Federally Administered Tribal Areas and Azad Jammu and Kashmir districts and villages. Both Rural Support Programmes have received the  Ashden Award in this regard. The Khyber Pakhtunkhwa Government has also decided to increase the number of micro hydropower generation projects to 1000, with total power generation capacity of 100 megawatts (MW). There are several barriers that are keepng Pakistan from nationwide off grid electrification, in spite of enough wind, water and sun to poweroff grid communities in Pakistan but the rate of conversion from no energy to alternative energy remains slow.  As per World Bank Study, almost 44% of Pakistani households have no access to grid based electricity.  80% of this deprived population resides in remote and rural areas.
 Off-grid electrification schemes are still operating in Sri Lanka   in spite 89% systematic grid expansion projects carried out by the Sri Lankan government to national grid.  Most of the Village Hydro Schemes (VHS) in Sri Lanka are aided by RERED project funded by World Bank and Global Environment Facility (GEF) these initiatives have established 100-150 Village Hydro Schemes in the country with capacities ranging from 3-50 kW.  However, off-grid generation is a diminishing component on the supply side.  This is a result of the fast expanding national grid, which now serves more than 90% of all homes.

Awareness competitions in India and Pakistan
Access to reliable and uninterrupted electricity is a chronic demand in villages all over the world.  The best solution for overcoming this problem is utilization of alternative energy with modern advancement with implementation of off-grid system.

India
In India competition for all enthusiastic entrepreneurs, individuals and organizations running energy access programmes and businesses in rural villages in India has also been launched and is about to close in November-2015. The participants were asked to highlight close sustainable examples where off-grid system is being practiced providing a platform for "energy entrepreneurs" to discuss the ways for achieving off-grid systems.  This competition has also good rewards for successful winners i.e. Cash Prize of I million Indian Rupees, a trip to world  Sustainable Development Forum to showcase their business on the  main stage, etc.

Pakistan

In Pakistan the Agha Khan University Examination Board in October-2015  launched a "Poster Competition" with the title "when ideas flow villages grow" as an initiative to introduce the idea of Smart Villages among young students and to evaluate best measures for its implementation.The most outstanding poster presentation from across the country will get a chance to visit the University of Cambridge, UK, besides other good prizes.

A female student of Aga Khan Higher Secondary School, one of the participant of the competition conducted the survey from her home place to villagers in remote areas by making connections with them through social media and cellular phones. According to her survey 50% of the people were found not satisfied with the rural electrification rate of PEPCO and other power distribution companies.  They also believe that off grid system is now a need for the villages of Pakistan.  Majority of the people were in favor of installing solar panels and wind turbines for energy generation in remote areas of Pakistan to boost up the development in energy sector of the country.

Smart villages in Europe 
The concept of smart villages has been discussed in the European context, for example with regards to some communities in Czech Republic, Montenegro and Poland.
For example, some offshoots of the European Youth Parliament are going to debate the topic as a part of a debate on regional development.

See also
Renewable energy in Asia
Renewable energy in developing countries
Smart city

References

Energy in Asia